Macefen is a former civil parish in the unitary authority of Cheshire West and Chester and the ceremonial county of Cheshire, England. Its area is now part of the civil parishes of Tushingham-cum-Grindley, Macefen and Bradley and No Man's Heath and District. Part of the village of No Man's Heath was within the northern boundary of Macefen. Its name is thought to possibly be an anglicisation of an older Welsh placename Maes-y-ffin, "the open field (maes) at the boundary (ffin)".

Macefen was a slightly curious parish in that it scarcely appears in gazetteers. Under the manorial system Macefen was a manor of the Barony of Malpas, and was for many years part of the estates of the Grosvenor family. Later it was a township of the ancient parish of Malpas, and later still its boundaries became those of a civil parish. Kelly's Directory of Cheshire, 1914 lists Macefen under Tushingham cum Grindley thus: "Macefen (or Maesfen) is a small township in the Whitchurch union, 2 miles south from Malpas station. It never had its own church but was served by adjacent churches. The civil parish was abolished in 2015 to form Tushingham-cum-Grindley, Macefen and Bradley and No Man's Heath and District.

References

Former civil parishes in Cheshire
Cheshire West and Chester